Damoe-Ra Park is an urban park in Darwin, the Northern Territory, designated in 1996. The park was named Damoe-Ra because the park includes a spring sacred to the Larrakia women,  and Damoe-Ra is the Larrakia word meaning "eye" or "spring". The park is situated below the escarpment on the coast below the Parliament House.  The garden itself, together with its  memorial pathway, plaques, and mosaic  honours the women of the Northern Territory.

Amongst the women honoured are some who had been awarded  a Tribute to Northern Territory Award :

References

Parks in the Northern Territory